Kenneth Burgos (born June 1, 1994) is an American politician from the state of New York. A Democrat, Burgos has represented the 85th district of the New York State Assembly, based in the southeastern Bronx, since November 2020.

Early life
Burgos and his three sisters were raised in the Bronx by a single mother. He attended the Bronx High School of Science and graduated from University at Albany, SUNY with a Bachelor of Arts degree in Economics. Burgos then began working for New York City Council Member Ruben Diaz, Sr., starting as a summer associate and eventually became a deputy chief of staff and budget director. Burgos is a member of Iota Phi Theta fraternity.

Political career
In February 2020, Marcos Crespo – Assemblyman for the 85th district and  chair of the Bronx County Democratic Party – announced his resignation. Burgos announced he would run for the seat and, with the backing of the Bronx County Democratic Committee, defeated William Moore 62-38% in the Democratic primary. Burgos easily won the general election in the strongly Democratic seat, and was seated on November 12, 2020.

References

Living people
1994 births
Politicians from the Bronx
New York (state) Democrats
21st-century American politicians
Hispanic and Latino American state legislators in New York (state)